More than 8,000 people have been elected a Fellow of the Royal Society of London, UK, since the inception of the Royal Society in 1660. The Royal Society publishes a database of current fellows and a database of past fellows.

Alphabetic lists

See also
 List of female Fellows of the Royal Society
 :Category:Fellows of the Royal Society (alphabetical)
 :Category:Lists of fellows of the Royal Society by year

References

Royal Society